Andrzej Wójs (born 5 December 1979 in Nowy Sącz) is a Polish slalom canoeist who competed at the international level from 1995 to 2005.

He won two bronze medals in the C2 team event at the ICF Canoe Slalom World Championships (2002, 2003). He also won a silver medal in the same event at the 1996 European Championships in Augsburg. Wójs also competed in two Summer Olympics, earning his best finish of sixth in the C2 event in Sydney in 2000.

His partner in the C2 boat for most of his active career was Sławomir Mordarski.

World Cup individual podiums

References

1979 births
Canoeists at the 1996 Summer Olympics
Canoeists at the 2000 Summer Olympics
Living people
Olympic canoeists of Poland
Polish male canoeists
Sportspeople from Nowy Sącz
Medalists at the ICF Canoe Slalom World Championships